Darna is a 1991 Filipino superhero film based on the Philippine comic character Darna, directed by Joel Lamangan and written by Frank G. Rivera. It stars Nanette Medved, Nida Blanca, Edu Manzano, Pilar Pilapil, Tonton Gutierrez, Bing Loyzaga, Dennis Padilla, and Atong Redillas. The film's special effects were done by Rolly Sto. Domingo.

The film was released through Viva Films on December 25, 1991, as part of the 17th Metro Manila Film Festival.

Plot
In the early 1900s, explorer Dominico Lipolico encounters a sinister relic in the Amazon jungle that gives him immortality in exchange for fomenting evil. In the present day, Dominico, who poses as a philanthropist, moves his operations to the Philippines to spread his deeds, recruiting fashion designer Valentina and a local admirer and giving them powers of a Gorgon and a winged "Manananggal", respectively. He also tries to recruit Darna, who is incarnated in a newspaper journalist named Narda. Valentina lures Darna at an event by releasing snakes to kill the audience, to which Darna comes to the rescue. Valentina's talking pet snake, Vibora discovers Darna's transformation into Narda, which enables Valentina to capture her. At Dominico's lair, Dominico forces Darna to join him by threatening her grandmother and siblings but is thwarted by her siblings rescuing Darna before she is fully transformed. Darna rescues Narda's newspaper companions George and Buster from an attack by the Manananggal, killing her by luring her to a church cross, while Valentina is accidentally killed during a fight with Darna when Vibora unwittingly gives a live grenade for Valentina to throw. Darna then confronts Dominico, who reveals himself as a Devil-incarnate who goes on a burning spree. He initially overpowers Darna, but is killed when she grabs the relic that he wears as a necklace and crushes it, resulting in the disintegration of Dominico and his minions.

Cast
Nanette Medved as Narda/Darna
Nida Blanca as Lola Isabel
Edu Manzano as Dominico Lipolico
Pilar Pilapil as Valentina
Tonton Gutierrez as George
Bing Loyzaga as Impakta/Manananggal
Dennis Padilla as Buster
Atong Redillas as Ding
Ruby Rodriguez as Vibora
Donna Cruz as Sally
Tony Lambino as Dong
Dencio Padilla
Paolo Contis as Young Dong
Errol Dionisio
Archi Adamos
Ray Ventura
Boy Roque
Jun Hidalgo
Jim Pebanco
Carmi Matic
Guila Alvarez
Roland Montes
Vina Morales - Angel

Accolades

References

External links

 

1991 films
1990s science fiction action films
1990s superhero films
Darna
Films based on Philippine comics
Films set in the 1900s
Live-action films based on comics
Philippine films based on comics
Philippine science fantasy films
Philippine science fiction action films
Philippine superhero films
Superheroine films
1990s Tagalog-language films
Films directed by Joel Lamangan